Max Paul Rushden (born 18 April 1979) is an English radio and television presenter and the current host of The Guardians Football Weekly podcast.

Rushden's first presenting role was BBC London 94.9's breakfast show from December 2006 to March 2008. He presented the Saturday morning Sky Sports show Soccer AM alongside Helen Chamberlain from August 2008 until 2015. He has a weekly Sunday show with Barry Glendenning on Talksport and has occasionally worked for BBC Radio 5 Live. He was a regular substitute presenter for James Richardson on Football Weekly, before becoming its main host in 2017 after Richardson quit to launch rival The Totally Football Show.

Rushden explains that the show "ranges from proper analysis of what has happened on the pitch in the UK and around Europe, to commentary about serious issues off it, balanced with some complete nonsense." He mentioned on an episode of Soccer AM that he had Irish ancestry through his grandparents. Rushden is a lifelong fan of Cambridge United F.C.

In 2021, Rushden signed with Australian UEFA competitions broadcaster Stan Sport to host their football coverage.

Rushden once had his Renault Clio car repaired by darts player James Wade.

In January 2023, Rushden’s home was broken into. His Subaru car was stolen, and his company credit card was used to spend $84 at a South Melbourne McDonald’s. His car was located by the police and returned to him in March 2023.

References

1979 births
Living people
English sports broadcasters
English association football commentators
English television presenters
English people of Jewish descent
Soccer AM
English podcasters